Scytalichthys miurus, the short-tailed viper-eel, is a species of eel in the family Ophichthidae. It is the only member of its genus. It is found in the eastern Pacific Ocean around Mexico and the Galapagos Islands.

References

Ophichthidae
Fish described in 1882
Taxa named by David Starr Jordan